The Donnington Brewery is a small brewery near the village of Donnington near Stow-on-the-Wold in Gloucestershire, England.

There are ten workers at the brewery and with the help of one lorry and a van they deliver 2,000 gallons of beer a week throughout the winter, rising to 3,500 in the summer. This includes three bottled beers – Light, Brown and Double D – that are non-pasteurised and sit working in the bottle for up to five weeks.

Thomas Arkell began brewing at this site in 1865. The brewery was later run by a descendant, Claude Arkell, until his death in 2007 when it passed to Claude's cousins, Peter and James from Arkell's Brewery.

The cotswold stone building, with an attached overshot waterwheel, powered by the waters of the River Dikler, is now a Grade II listed building. The first record of a mill at the site was in 1291. The original corn mill was converted to a cloth mill by the 16th century and it was rebuilt around 1580. The current buildings are largely from the late 18th and early 19th century.

Donnington Brewery brews two draught beers, SBA and BB, having stopped making its Mild XXX a couple of years ago. These are sold through its 18 tied pubs around the Cotswolds.

There were two more tied pubs. The Merry Mouth is still trading but no longer owned by Donnington. The Bell at Winchcombe was sold by its last landlord and the site converted into a number of houses.

A "Donnington run" means visiting all 15 pubs in a single evening. A path called the Donnington Way connects all the 15 pubs.

References

External links
Donnington Brewery

Breweries in England
Companies based in Gloucestershire
Gloucestershire cuisine
British companies established in 1865
Food and drink companies established in 1865
Watermills in Gloucestershire